Charlotte Moss (born 9 January 1998), known professionally as Lottie Moss, is a British fashion model. She is the half-sister of model Kate Moss.

Early life
Moss was born to Peter Moss and Inger Solnordal. Through her father she is the half-sister of model Kate Moss who had already achieved international fame by the time Moss was born.

Career
Moss first appeared in the pages of American Vogue in 2011 as her elder half-sister's wedding was featured in the magazine and Moss was a bridesmaid. 

In 2014 Moss signed with Storm Management. Her first featured photoshoot was an appearance in Dazed magazine while her first print editorial was in Teen Vogue. That same year she was also featured in a series of ads for Calvin Klein, whom her sister had also modelled for. 

Moss landed her first Vogue cover in 2016, appearing on the cover of Paris Vogue alongside model Lucky Blue Smith.

In 2021 Moss announced she would be selling nude photos of herself on the content subscription service OnlyFans. Moss defended the decision by saying she was a "very sexual person". In an interview with the Private Parts podcast Moss revealed that because her career had heavily benefitted from nepotism she had an uncomfortable relationship with fame. She further explained that she enjoyed the control she had in the creation of her own content.

Personal life
Moss identifies as pansexual.

In December 2022, Moss shared a TikTok clip of her getting a face tattoo of the word "lover" underneath her left eye.

References

External links

 

1998 births
Living people
English female models
OnlyFans creators